William Frederick Bretton (2 May 1909 – 4 November 1971) was the Dean of Nelson from 1957  until 1970.

Bretton was educated at Downing College, Cambridge and  ordained in 1935. His first posts were curacies in Watford and Sparkhill. He was Vicar of St Cuthbert Birmingham from 1939 to 1942, and then St John the Evangelist, Sandown. Moving to New Zealand he held incumbencies in Johnsonville and Lower Hutt before his appointment as Dean.

In 1953, Bretton was awarded the Queen Elizabeth II Coronation Medal.

References

1909 births
1971 deaths
Deans of Nelson
Alumni of Downing College, Cambridge